The Palembang Bovenlanden Expeditions were punitive expeditions by the Royal Netherlands East Indies Army to Palembang in South Sumatra (1851–1859).

Sources
 1900. W.A. Terwogt. Het land van Jan Pieterszoon Coen. Geschiedenis van de Nederlanders in oost-Indië. P. Geerts. Hoorn
 1900. G. Kepper. Wapenfeiten van het Nederlands Indische Leger; 1816–1900. M.M. Cuvee, Den Haag.'
 1876. A.J.A. Gerlach. Nederlandse heldenfeiten in Oost Indë. Drie delen. Gebroeders Belinfante, Den Haag.

Dutch conquest of Indonesia
South Sumatra
Palembang
1850s conflicts